The UEFA Women's Euro 2013 qualifying – Group 2 was contested by six teams competing for one spot for the final tournament.

Spain's María Paz set a new competition record when she scored seven goals against Kazakhstan.

Standings

Fixtures
All times are UTC+2.

Goalscorers
17 goals
 Célia Okoyino da Mbabi

11 goals
 Ramona Bachmann

10 goals
 Verónica Boquete
 María Paz Vilas

8 goals
 Alexandra Popp

7 goals
 Martina Müller
 Laura Rus

6 goals

 Melanie Behringer
 Cosmina Duşa
 Adriana Martín
 Sonia Bermúdez

5 goals

 Fatmire Bajramaj
 Ana-Maria Crnogorčević
 Lara Dickenmann

4 goals
 Priscila Borja

3 goals

 Linda Bresonik
 Lena Goeßling
 Simone Laudehr
 Anja Mittag
 Babett Peter
 Sandy Mändly

2 goals

 Dzsenifer Marozsán
 Anne-Marie Bănuță
 Andreea Laiu

1 goal

 Viola Odebrecht
 Bianca Schmidt
 Saule Karibayeva
 Begaim Kirgizbaeva
 Larisa Li
 Mariya Yalova
 Ioana Bortan
 Maria Ficzay
 Raluca Sârghe
 Marta Corredera
 Ruth García
 Silvia Meseguer
 Amaia Olabarrieta
 Marta Torrejón
 Willy
 Caroline Abbé
 Jehona Mehmeti
 Martina Moser
 Lia Wälti
 Selina Zumbühl
 Bilgin Defterli
 Leyla Güngör
 Yağmur Uraz

1 own goal
 Maria Ficzay (playing against Turkey)
 Ruth García (playing against Germany)
 Marie-Andrea Egli (playing against Germany)
 Seval Kıraç (playing against Spain)

References

Group 2

2
2011–12 in German women's football
2012–13 in German women's football
2011–12 in Spanish women's football
2012–13 in Spanish women's football
2011 in Kazakhstani football
2012 in Kazakhstani football
2011–12 in Romanian football
2012–13 in Romanian football
2011–12 in Swiss football
2012–13 in Swiss football
2011–12 in Turkish football
2012–13 in Turkish football
Qual